Daniel R. Montello (born 1959) is an American geographer and professor at the Department of Geography of the University of California Santa Barbara, and at its Department of Psychological & Brain Sciences, known for his work on geovisualization and cognitive geography.

Biography 
Montello obtained his BA in psychology at the Johns Hopkins University in 1981, and in 1986 his MA in psychology at the Arizona State University, where in 1991 he also obtained his PhD in psychology with a thesis in the area of environmental psychology.

Montello started his academic career as postdoctoral fellow at University of Minnesota in the Institute of Child Development. In 1992 he moved to the University of California, Santa Barbara, where he started as assistant professor in the Department of Geography. In 1996 he was appointed associate professor and since 2002 he is professor. Since 1995 he is also affiliated with the Universities Department of Psychological & Brain Sciences, and since 2006 with the SAGE Center for the Study of the Mind at the university.

Montello is elected member of the Association of American Geographers, the Psychonomics Society, and the Sigma Xi Scientific Honor Society.

Selected publications 
 Montello, Daniel, and Paul Sutton. An introduction to scientific research methods in geography. Sage Publications, 2006.
 Montello, Daniel R., Karl E. Grossner, and Donald G. Janelle. Space in Mind: Concepts for Spatial Learning and Education. MIT Press, 2014.

Articles, a selection:
 Montello, Daniel R. "Scale and multiple psychologies of space." Spatial information theory a theoretical basis for gis. Springer Berlin Heidelberg, 1993. 312–321.
 Slocum, T. A., Blok, C., Jiang, B., Koussoulakou, A., Montello, D. R., Fuhrmann, S., & Hedley, N. R. (2001). "Cognitive and usability issues in geovisualization." Cartography and Geographic Information Science, 28(1), 61–75.
 Hegarty, M., Richardson, A. E., Montello, D. R., Lovelace, K., & Subbiah, I. (2002). "Development of a self-report measure of environmental spatial ability." Intelligence, 30(5), 425–447.
 Richardson, Anthony E., Daniel R. Montello, and Mary Hegarty. "Spatial knowledge acquisition from maps and from navigation in real and virtual environments." Memory & cognition 27.4 (1999): 741–750.
 Dalton, R. C., Hölscher, C., & Montello, D. R. (2019). Wayfinding as a Social Activity. Frontiers in psychology, 10, 142.

References

External links 
 Homepage at University of California Santa Barbara

1959 births
Living people
21st-century American psychologists
Johns Hopkins University alumni
Arizona State University alumni
University of California, Santa Barbara faculty
20th-century American psychologists